Warwick Olney Fyfe (born 27 September 1969, in Canberra) is an Australian operatic heldenbaritone who has an international career. Winner of the Helpmann Award for Best Male in an Operatic Feature Role for his performance as Alberich in Opera Australia's 2013 Bi-Centenary Cycles of Der Ring des Nibelungen at the State Theatre in Melbourne. In August 2017 a career highlight was singing Klingsor in a concert performance of Richard Wagner's Parsifal starring Jonas Kaufmann with Opera Australia at the Sydney Opera House.

Career
Fyfe is an alumnus of the Victoria College of the Arts (Melbourne University) Opera Studio and a Winston Churchill Fellow. On graduation he was a member of the Victoria State Opera, and the Opera Australia Young Artist Programs. He subsequently had a long association with Opera Australia as a senior principal artist. Internationally, he has worked with New Zealand Opera, English Touring Opera Company, Welsh National Opera, Victorian Opera, and has also performed in Singapore, Vietnam, Japan and China.

Concert work includes performances with the Japan Philharmonic, the Tianjin Symphony Orchestra, the Melbourne Symphony Orchestra, Sydney Symphony, Adelaide Symphony, Tasmanian Symphony, Queensland Symphony, Western Australian Symphony; the Auckland Philharmonic, New Zealand Symphony, Warsaw Symphony, Singapore Symphony orchestras, and The Orchestra of The Music Makers (Singapore).

Awards include a Helpmann Award for his 2013 performance as Alberich, in Wagner's Ring Cycle in Melbourne, the Bayreuth Scholarship (2007); a Green Room Award (2005); the Leopold Julian Kronenberg Foundation Award at the Stanislaw Moniuszko International Vocal Competition (Warsaw, 2001); a Bayreuth Bursary (2000); first prize in The McDonald's Aria (1998); The Heinz Australian Youth Aria; The Dame Mabel Brookes Memorial Fellowship; The Austral Salon Scholarship and The Mabel Kent Scholarship. In 2015 he was awarded a Winston Churchill Fellowship to study Wagnerian Vocal technique in Germany, the US and the U.K.

Most recently he has performed the role of Sancho Panza (Don Quichotte) in Sydney and Melbourne. Forthcoming roles include Beckmesser in Die Meistersinger von Nürnberg, (Melbourne); Athanael in Thais, and Amonasro in Aida (both with Finnish National Opera).

Operatic repertoire
 Sixtus Beckmesser, Die Meistersinger von Nürnberg, Wagner
 Alberich, Der Ring des Nibelungen, Wagner, Arts Centre Melbourne, Opera Australia (OA)
 Alberich, Das Rheingold, Wagner; Japan Philharmonic Orchestra, Bunka Kaikan Theater, Tokyo; Tianjin Symphony Orchestra, Tianjin Concert Hall
 Hollaender, Der fliegende Holländer, Wagner, Sydney Opera House (SOH), OA
 Wolfram von Eschenbach, Tannhäuser, Wagner
 Klingsor, Parsifal, Wagner; SOH, OA
 The Dutchman, Der fliegende Holländer, Wagner; SOH
 Heerrufer, Lohengrin, Wagner
 Rigoletto, Rigoletto, Verdi. SOH, MAC, OA. Aeotea Centre Auckland, St. James' Theatre, Wellington, New Zealand Opera (NZO)
 Amonasro, Aida, Verdi, SOH, MAC, Handa Opera on the Harbour, OA
 Paolo, Simon Boccanegra, Verdi, Sydney Opera House, Opera Australia.
 Falstaff, Falstaff, Verdi; Sydney Opera House, Arts Centre Melbourne
 Offenbach, The Tales of Hoffmann, Offenbach, (Lindorf, Coppelius, Dr Miracle, Dappertutto). Multiple venues UK, English Touring Opera
 Dr Schön / Jack the Ripper, Lulu, Berg. Opera Australia, Arts Centre Melbourne
 Mandryka, Arabella, Richard Strauss. MAC, OA
 Faninal, Der Rosenkavalier, Strauss. SOH, OA
 Peter, Hänsel und Gretel, Humperdinck; Esplanade Concert Hall Singapore
 Tonio, Pagliacci, Leoncavallo. Te Aroa Centre, Auckland; St James' Theatre Wellington NZ, NZO
 Scarpia, Tosca, Puccini;
 Germont pére, La traviata, Verdi; SOH, MAC, HANDA Opera on the Harbour
 Don Pizarro, Fidelio, Beethoven, SOH, OA

Roles in preparation
 Beckmesser, Die Meistersinger von Nürnberg, Wagner
 Athanael, Thaïs, Massenet

Concert repertoire
 Bartók, Bluebeard's Castle
 Beethoven, Symphony No.9
 Handel, Messiah
 Mozart, Requiem
 Verdi, Requiem
 Orff, Carmina Burana
 Bach, St Matthew Passion
 Bach, St John Passion
 Bach, Mass in B minor
 Brahms, A German Requiem
 Mahler, Symphony No. 8
 Rachmaninoff, The Bells
 Rossini, Stabat Mater
 Szymanowski, Stabat Mater
 Strauss, Elektra

Recordings

 Prokofiev, The Love for Three Oranges (Chandos CD)
 R. Strauss, Der Rosenkavalier (Opera Australia CD/DVD)

Awards

 Helpmann Award for Best Male in an Operatic Feature Role for his performance as Alberich in Opera Australia's 2013 Bi-Centenary Cycles of Der Ring des Nibelungen in Melbourne
 Bayreuth Scholarship 2007
Bayreuth Bursary 2000
 Churchill Fellowship 2015
 Green Room Award 2005
 Leopold Julian Krönenberg Award at the Stanislaw Moniuszko International Vocal Competition, Warsaw 2001
 McDonald's Aria Sydney 1998
 The Heinz Australian Youth Aria, Dandenong
 The Dame Mabel Brookes Memorial Fellowship
 The Austral Salon Scholarship
 The Mabel Kent Scholarship.

References

External links 
 
 Australian / Asia / US Agent website
 Opera Base
 United Kingdom / Europe Agent website
 Aus Stage career summary

1969 births
Victorian College of the Arts alumni
Musicians from Canberra
Living people
Australian operatic baritones
20th-century Australian male opera singers
21st-century Australian male opera singers
Helpmann Award winners